The 46th Japan National University Rugby Championship (2009/2010).

Qualifying Teams
Kanto League A (Taiko)
 Waseda, Keio University, University of Tsukuba, Teikyo University, Meiji

Kanto League B
 Tokai University, Kanto Gakuin University, Hosei, Ryutsu Keizai University, Takushoku University

Kansai League
 Kwansei Gakuin, Tenri University, Setsunan University, Doshisha, Ritsumei

Kyushu League
 Fukuoka University

Knockout stage

Final

Universities Competing
 Waseda
 Keio University
 University of Tsukuba
 Teikyo University
 Meiji
 Tokai University
 Kanto Gakuin University
 Hosei
 Ryutsu Keizai University
 Takushoku University
 Kwansei Gakuin
 Tenri University
 Setsunan University
 Doshisha
 Ritsumei
 Fukuoka University

External links
 The 46th Japan University Rugby Championship - JRFU Official Page (Japanese)
 The 46th Japan University Rugby Championship - JRFU Official Scores with Reports (Japanese)
 Rugby union in Japan

All-Japan University Rugby Championship
Univ
Japan Univer